Everything Not Saved Will Be Lost – Part 2 is the sixth studio album by British rock band Foals. It was released on 18 October 2019 through Warner and Transgressive Records. The album is considered the second half of a two-part project, being supplemented by their consecutive fifth studio album Everything Not Saved Will Be Lost – Part 1, released 8 March 2019. The album cover was shot by famed National Geographic photographer, Maggie Steber. The album was preceded by three singles; "Black Bull", "The Runner", and "Into the Surf". The album became the band's first to reach No. 1 on the UK Albums Chart. The album was the last to feature keyboardist Edwin Congreave before his departure from the band in 2021.

Promotion
The album's lead singles, "Black Bull" and "The Runner" were debuted 1 August and 5 September 2019 respectively via Annie Mac's BBC Radio 1 show alongside the former's music video premiere (via YouTube). The album's third single, "Into the Surf" was released 25 September 2019 via Zane Lowe's Beats 1 radio show, with the animated music video premiering a few weeks later on 7 October 2019.

In further promotion of Part 2, the band announced an upcoming tour documentary of the past year, Rip Up the Road, released on 15 November 2019 exclusively via Amazon Prime, alongside news of a special live performance at The House of Vans skatepark in London on the day of the album's release.

Critical reception

At Metacritic, which assigns a normalised rating out of 100 to reviews from mainstream critics, the album received an average score of 77, based on 16 reviews, which indicates "generally favorable reviews". 

In his review for Q, Dave Everley praised the album, saying it "underlines why its creators have continued to prosper long after so many of their late-'00s contemporaries have been lost to the waves."

James McNair of Mojo gave the album a mixed review, praising  "Black Bull", "Into the Surf", and "The Runner" but criticising the album's "brittle" production, writing, "For the first time in their career Foals sound like they are overreaching themselves a little."

Year-end rankings

Track listing

Personnel
 Yannis Philippakis – vocals, guitar, bass
 Jimmy Smith – guitar, keyboards
 Jack Bevan – drums
 Edwin Congreave – keyboards, synthesizers, bass

Charts

Certifications

References

2019 albums
Foals (band) albums
Transgressive Records albums
Warner Records albums
Sequel albums
Albums about climate change